The Factories Act, 1948 (Act No. 63 of 1948), as amended by the Factories (Amendment) Act, 1987 (Act 20 of 1987), served to assist in formulating national policies in India with respect to occupational safety and health in factories and docks in India. It deals with various problems concerning safety, health, efficiency and well-being of the persons at work places. It was replaced by the Occupational Safety, Health and Working Conditions Code, 2020.

The Act is administered by the Ministry of Labour and Employment in India through its Directorate General Factory Advice Service & Labour Institutes (DGFASLI) and by the State Governments through their factory inspectorates. DGFASLI advises the Central and State Governments on administration of the Factories Act and coordinating the factory inspection services in the States.

The  Act is applicable to any factory using power & employing 10 or more workers and if not using power, employing 20 or more workers on any day of the preceding twelve months, and in any part of which a manufacturing process is being carried on with the aid of power, or is ordinarily so carried on, or whereon twenty or more workers are working, or were working on any day of the preceding twelve months, and in any part of which a manufacturing process is being carried on without any power

Major contents
Various provisions are described in following chapters:
	CHAPTER I.-  Preliminary
	CHAPTER II.- The Inspecting Staff
	CHAPTER III.- Health
	CHAPTER IV.- Safety's
	CHAPTER IVA.- Provisions relating to Hazardous processes
	CHAPTER V.- Welfare & Grievance  
	CHAPTER VI.- Working hours of adults
	CHAPTER VII.- Employment of young persons
	CHAPTER VIII.- Annual leave with wages
	CHAPTER IX.- Special provisions
	CHAPTER X.- Penalties and procedure
      CHAPTER XI.- Supplemental

Notes

See also
 Factories 1961
 Industrial Disputes Act, 1947

Indian legislation
Industry in India
Occupational safety and health law
Acts of the Parliament of India 1948